John Colshull (died 1413), of Friday Street, London, was an English Member of Parliament for Cornwall in 1391, 1394, January 1397 and 1399. He was also common councillor in Vintry, twice sheriff of Cornwall, a justice of the peace in Cornwall, steward of the duchy estates in Cornwall, and deputy butler at London and Sandwich. He was the father of John, who died in 1418.

References

14th-century births
1413 deaths
English MPs 1391
English MPs 1394
English MPs January 1397
English MPs 1399
14th-century English politicians
Members of the Parliament of England (pre-1707) for Cornwall
Councilmen of the City of London
High Sheriffs of Cornwall
English justices of the peace
Stewards (office)
British butlers